Dozier is an unincorporated community located in Forsyth County, North Carolina, United States, near the Yadkin River.  It is mostly centered at the junction of Vienna-Dozier and Waller Roads.

References

Unincorporated communities in Forsyth County, North Carolina
Unincorporated communities in North Carolina